Bocenago (Buzanàc or Bozanàc in local dialect) is a comune (municipality) in Trentino in the northern Italian region Trentino-Alto Adige/Südtirol, located about  west of Trento.

Bocenago borders the following municipalities: Spiazzo, Strembo, Caderzone, Massimeno, Stenico, Montagne, and Comano Terme.

The ten most common surnames in Bocenago are Alberti, Boroni, Riccadonna, Franzelli, Ferrazza, Fostini, Botteri, Cavoli, Bonafini, and Maffei.

Demographic evolution

References

External links
 Homepage of the city

Cities and towns in Trentino-Alto Adige/Südtirol